Geoffrey B. Hajim (born February 25, 1966) is a Hawaiian producer, writer and visual artist producer who resides in Hilo, Hawaii. He has been involved in over 150 projects ranging from television commercials to the first feature film to be produced in the Hawaiian language.

Career
In 1997, Hajim produced a documentary about Hawaii Volcanoes National Park for the Discovery Channel, and collaborated with Pūnana Leo to create over 120 videos in the Hawaiian language. He is also credited with producing the first feature length film in Hawaiian, and during this time period, he became fluent in the language.

In 2013, Hajim directed and produced an animated, science fiction musical film, titled Strange Frame: Love & Sax in collaboration with filmmaker Shelley Doty. To achieve the desired level of sound quality, he enlisted the help of sound engineers from Skywalker Sound, including Gary Rizzo and voice casting agent Jamie Thomason. This led to the casting of Claudia Christian, Tim Curry, Michael Dorn, Ron Glass, George Takei, and Alan Tudyk to voice the characters in the film.

Hawaii Con
With the support of a successful Kickstarter campaign that exceeded its initial goal of $35,000, 2014, Hajim founded HawaiiCon in September of 2014.It was a conference that was designed to promote a sense of 'ohana and respect for the land. HawaiiCon was a three-day science, sci-fi and fantasy convention that took place on Hawaii's Big Island. The event featured guests, including cast members from Stargate Atlantis, Star Trek, and Game of Thrones. Attendees could experience astronomy and mock Mars missions, learn about ancient Hawaiian mythology, and participate in workshops and tours. The conference also included panels and discussions led by experts in the field of astronomy, aerospace, and Hawaiian culture.

In 2018 Hajim taught 'Images in Motion Art' at Hawaiʻi Community College.

Filmography

Awards and nominations 

 In 2012, Hajim's Film Strange Frame won Best Feature Film at DragonCon.

 In 2013, Hajim's Film Strange Frame won Best Animated Feature at the Big Island Film Festival.
 The Weirdcademy Awards bestowed Hajim's Strange Frame with both the award of Weirdest Movie of 2013 and Weirdest Actress Award to Claudia Black for her voiceover performance as saxophonist Parker.

References

External links

Film directors from Hawaii
Artists from Hawaii
1966 births
Living people
People from Hilo, Hawaii